Crossacres is a tram stop for the Phase 3B Extension of Greater Manchester's Metrolink system. The stop is part of the Airport Line and is at the junction of Brownley Road and Crossacres Road in the Wythenshawe area of Manchester, England. It opened on 3 November 2014.

Services
Trams run every 12 minutes north to Victoria and south to Manchester Airport. Between 03:00 and 06:00, a service operates Deansgate-Castlefield and Manchester Airport every 20 minutes.

Ticket zones 
Crossacres stop is located in Metrolink ticket zone 4.

References

External links

 Metrolink stop information
 Crossacres area map
 Light Rail Transit Association
 Airport route map

Tram stops in Manchester